Miroslav Dvořák (October 11, 1951 – June 12, 2008), nicknamed "Cookie", was a Czechoslovak professional ice hockey defenseman who played three seasons in the NHL with the Philadelphia Flyers. He is also well known as a famous player of Czech Extraliga (Czechoslovak) team HC České Budějovice, where he spent most of his active career.

Playing career
In 1967 he started professional ice hockey career playing for HC České Budějovice Junior team and from 1970 became a member of 'senior team'. In the same year Dvořák was named the best defender of World Junior Ice Hockey Championships held in Sweden. During his military service he moved to the army team Dukla Jihlava where he spent 2 seasons. He also played for Czechoslovak national ice hockey team and won 8 medals overall in the Ice Hockey World Championships in years 1974, 1975, 1976, 1977, 1978, 1982 and 1983 and represented Czechoslovakia on 1976 and 1981 Canada Cups and on 1980 Winter Olympics as well. He was drafted by Philadelphia Flyers in the 3rd round in 1982 and played 3 seasons in North America, playing in the NHL for Philadelphia. He had to wait until his thirties to play NHL, as playing overseas under the age of 30 was strictly prohibited because of sports rules during communism era in Czechoslovakia. He left professional ice hockey after the 88-89 season and went back to Czechoslovakia to play for HC České Budějovice.

Death
Dvořák died in the Czech Republic after a long battle with throat cancer at the age of 56 on June 12, 2008. His family played composer Antonín Dvořák's "New World Symphony" at the funeral.

Career statistics

Regular season and playoffs

TCH totals do not include statistics from the 1970–71, 1972–73 to 1974–75, and 1976–77 seasons.

International

References

External links
 
 
 
 

1951 births
2008 deaths
Czech ice hockey defencemen
Czechoslovak ice hockey defencemen
Olympic ice hockey players of Czechoslovakia
Olympic medalists in ice hockey
Olympic silver medalists for Czechoslovakia
Ice hockey players at the 1976 Winter Olympics
Ice hockey players at the 1980 Winter Olympics
Medalists at the 1976 Winter Olympics
Philadelphia Flyers draft picks
Philadelphia Flyers players
HC Dukla Jihlava players
Motor České Budějovice players
People from Hluboká nad Vltavou
Deaths from cancer in the Czech Republic
Deaths from esophageal cancer
Sportspeople from the South Bohemian Region
Czechoslovak expatriate sportspeople in the United States
Czechoslovak expatriate sportspeople in West Germany
Expatriate ice hockey players in the United States
Expatriate ice hockey players in West Germany
Czechoslovak expatriate ice hockey people